Compliments Please is the first studio album by the British musician Self Esteem, aka Rebecca Lucy Taylor, released on 1 March 2019.

Writing and recording 
Tracks for the Self Esteem debut album were recorded by Taylor in Margate from January to September 2018 with producer and co-writer Johan Hugo Karlberg. Taylor signed a record deal with Fiction Records in April 2018. During the period of recording she played live at Latitude, Tramlines and a sold out show at Omeara Theatre London, followed by an eight-show UK tour in autumn 2018.

Release and reception 
The first single "Wrestling" was released in July 2018 followed by "Rollout" in September 2018, "The Best" in January 2019 and "Girl Crush" in February 2019. Compliments Please was released on 1 March 2019 on Fiction Records. It was well received critically, with an average rating of 80/100 according to Metacritic. A deluxe version was released in October 2019 with an additional track "Rooms".

Track listing

References 

2019 debut albums